Elias Michael Pienaar (born 10 January 1978) is a Namibian footballer for Carara Kicks in the South African National First Division.

Career
He previously played for Ramblers F.C. in his home country.

Currently playing for FNB Orlando Pirates in the Namibian Premier League.

International career
Pienaar plays with the Namibia national football team. He also captained Namibia at the 2008 Africa Cup of Nations.

References

1978 births
Living people
Namibian people of South African descent
Namibian men's footballers
Namibia international footballers
2008 Africa Cup of Nations players
Association football defenders
Namibian expatriate sportspeople in South Africa
Ramblers F.C. players
Orlando Pirates S.C. players
Namibian expatriate footballers
Expatriate soccer players in South Africa
Carara Kicks F.C. players